Jüdischer Friedhof Köln-Bocklemünd is a cemetery in Cologne, Germany. A Jewish burial site since 1918, many of its tombstones are noted for their extravagant artistic designs.

References

External links
 

Bocklemund Jewish
Bocklemund